Bard of Blood is a 2019 Indian spy thriller web series based on the 2015 espionage novel of the same name by Bilal Siddiqi. Directed by Ribhu Dasgupta and produced by Red Chillies Entertainment, the series stars Emraan Hashmi along with Kirti Kulhari, Vineet Kumar Singh, Jaideep Ahlawat and Sobhita Dhulipala. 
It is a seven-episode series that revolves around the story of an ex-IIW agent. The series premiered on 27 September 2019 on Netflix.

Overview
Kabir Anand is a former Indian Intelligence Wing (IIW) agent who has fallen out after an operation that resulted in his partner's death. He is now a literature teacher who looks after his deceased friend's wife and son. When four Indian intelligence officers are captured by Taliban in Quetta, the secret service director Sadiq Sheikh summons a reluctant Kabir to rescue them. He refuses at first, but when he finally decides to undertake the mission, he arrives at Sadiq's house to find the latter dead. He is suspected of the murder and is interrogated by the intelligence head Arum Joshi, who later allows him to walk free. Upon noticing a man clicking pictures during the cremation of Sadiq, Kabir chases him and instead ends up meeting with analyst Isha Khanna. Decoding a message left by Sadiq before his death, Kabir comes to the conclusion that this mission in Baluchistan would be unsanctioned, and would involve him, Isha and another agent named Veer Singh who has been working undercover for a long time and wants to go home. Teaming up to complete the mission once they meet, Kabir and team face a lot of challenges on their way to Quetta while Arun learns of the unsanctioned mission and starts tracking them.

Cast

 Emraan Hashmi as Kabir Anand/Adonis
 Vineet Kumar Singh as Veer Singh
 Sobhita Dhulipala as Isha Khanna
 Danish Husain as Mullah Khalid
 Kirti Kulhari as Jannat Marri 
 Abhishekh Khan as Nusrat Bashir Marri
 Ajay Mahendru as Rehmat Khatib
 Asheish Nijhawan as Aftab Khalid
 Shamaun Ahmed as Qasim Baluchi
 Jaideep Ahlawat as Tanveer Shehzad
 Rajit Kapur as Sadiq Sheikh 
 Shishir Sharma as Arun Joshi
 Amit Bimrot as Nihar Gupta
 Sohum Shah as Vikramjeet
 Shruti Marathe as Neeta
 Sahiba Bali as Abida, ISI agent and love-interest of Tanveer Shehzad
 Kallirroi Tziafeta as Jessica Parker /Sara Mansoor (Cover)
 Nikita Sharma
Tanveer 
Harshvardhan Singh
 Ankit Hans as captured agent
Akshat Chopra as agent Samar Sharm
Vishwajeet Jaykar as Saif
Sharik Khan as Sadiq friend
Shah Fahad (uncredit)

Episodes
The episode titles are quotations from Shakespearean plays.

Release
The show features characters interacting in Hindi, Urdu, Pashto and English. It premiered on 27 September 2019 on Netflix.

Reception 
Rohan Naahar of The Hindu Times gave 2 stars and stated "It is one thing to have a poor script to begin with, but the problems metastasise when neither the filmmaking nor the acting is able to elevate it."

References

External links

2019 Indian television series debuts
2019 Indian television series endings
Indian television series distributed by Netflix
Indian action television series
Indian thriller television series
Hindi-language Netflix original programming
Red Chillies Entertainment
Research and Analysis Wing in fiction
Television shows based on Indian novels
Television shows set in Pakistan
India–Pakistan relations in popular culture
Television shows set in Quetta